Edward Victor Boursaud  (September 1, 1840 – March 19, 1902) was an American Catholic priest and Jesuit. Raised in New York City and France, he studied at Mount St. Mary's College in Maryland before entering the Society of Jesus in 1863. For the next 18 years, he studied and taught at Jesuit institutions, including Boston College, Georgetown College, and Woodstock College, as well as the novitiate in Frederick, Maryland. In 1881 and 1887, he served for three years each in Italy as the assistant secretary to the Jesuit Superior General for the English-speaking world.

In 1884, Boursaud became the president of Boston College, where he would remain for three years. He then served three years as the rector of Woodstock College from 1890 to 1893. In his later years, he spent time teaching and as a spiritual father at Jesuit institutions throughout the eastern United States.

Early life 
Edward Victor Boursaud was born on September 1, 1840, in New York City. Boursaud's father, Augustin, was born in Bourdeaux, France, and emigrated to New York at the age of thirty. Boursaud's mother, Elizabeth née Perret, was born in New York City and was of French and Swiss descent. The two were married in New York City by Archbishop John Hughes, who was a friend of Boursaud's father. Boursaud's parents moved to Baltimore, Maryland, where his father ran a large, private, boarding school and day school for 10 years. They then moved to Brooklyn in 1850, where his father would operate his school for another 18 years. While Boursaud's mother was visiting New York City (Brooklyn was then a separate city), she gave birth to Boursaud.

Boursaud was educated by his father in his school. While a child, he moved with his parents to France. Boursaud studied there before returning to the United States. He worked for a time as a clerk in an import house in New York City. Boursaud then he enrolled at Mount St. Mary's College in Emmitsburg, Maryland, and graduated in June 1863. He became familiar with the Jesuits during a retreat, and entered the Society of Jesus on August 14 of that year, proceeding to the Jesuit novitiate in Frederick, Maryland.

Jesuit formation 
After two years as a novice, Boursaud became a professor of the classics at the Jesuit juniorate in Frederick. In his first year, he also taught grammar, and in his second year, he taught poetry. While at the novitiate, he translated Joseph-Epiphane Darras's A General History of the Catholic Church from French into English, at Archbishop Martin John Spalding's request. Boursaud then taught poetry at Georgetown College in Washington, D.C., from 1867 to 1870. He also served as the president of the Philodemic Society at Georgetown. Boursaud began his philosophical and theological studies at Woodstock College in Woodstock, Maryland, in September 1871. During this time, he was also a writer and effectively an editor for the Messenger of the Sacred Heart.

Boursaud was ordained a priest on April 6, 1877, and completed his theological studies the next year. In 1878, he went to Boston College in Massachusetts, teaching sophomores as a professor poetry, then of rhetoric, for a year each. In 1879, one of his students was William Henry O'Connell, a future cardinal and archbishop of Boston. In 1880, he taught juniors at the Frederick scholasticate as a professor or rhetoric. Boursaud then returned to Woodstock College for a year of asceticism.

Boursaud was then appointed the assistant secretary of the Jesuit Superior General's assistancy for the English-speaking world, the first American to hold this position. He was fluent in English, French, Italian, Spanish, and Latin, which was useful in this position. He remained in this position for four years, and resided in Fiesole, Italy, where the Superior General was then based. During his first year there, he also completed his third year of probation, and professed his final vows on August 15, 1882, which were accepted by the Superior General, Peter Jan Beckx.

Boston College 
Boursaud returned to the United States, and on July 31, 1884, he succeeded Jeremiah O'Conor as the fifth president of Boston College. During his presidency, he was also the pastor of Immaculate Conception Church in the South End of Boston, which was Boston College's chapel. Enrollment at the college increased from 250 in 1883 to 297 in 1886. His first project was to remodel and expand the basement of Immaculate Conception Church. To the simple church, he had added marble altars, statues, and stained glass windows. During a strike by streetcar workers, in support of the strikers, Boursaud refused to ride the streetcars.

The requirements for the degree of Master of Arts were first established during Boursaud's term, but the first master's degree was not awarded until after the end of his presidency. When approached by an alumnus about creating a Boston College alumni organization, Boursaud was reluctant to endorse it because he believe there were be insufficient interest by alumni. However, after interest was shown, he gave his approval for alumni to create it in 1886. Boursaud's presidency came to an end on August 5, 1887, and he was succeeded by Thomas H. Stack.

Later years 
After the end of his presidency of Boston College, Boursaud returned to Italy and resumed the position of assistant secretary of the English-speaking assistancy for three years. Around this time, his health began to decline, and, he returned to the United States in 1890, initially going to Georgetown. On October 9, 1890, Boursaud became the rector of Woodstock College. He held this position until November 29, 1893, when his health began to significantly deteriorate.

In 1894, Boursaud was stationed at Saint Joseph's College in Philadelphia, Pennsylvania, as an assistant to the central director of the Apostleship of Prayer and as a staff member of the Messenger of the Sacred Heart, that organization's publication. When the apostleship moved to New York City, he moved with it. In 1895, Boursaud returned to Boston College served as the treasurer. The following year, he became a teacher of the lower classes and as a spiritual father at Boston College.

Due to his failing health, Boursaud was sent by his superiors to Spring Hill College in Mobile, Alabama. When his health improved, he went to Frederick for a year as the instructor of the third year of probation. He then was stationed at the College of St. Francis Xavier in New York City and Saint Joseph's College in Philadelphia for a year each as spiritual father. After a time at Woodstock College, where he translated and edited a new edition of the Raccolta, he retired to the Frederick novitiate. In Frederick, he suffered several strokes and kidney disease.

Boursaud died on March 19, 1902, at the Jesuit novitiate in Frederick, Maryland. His body was buried in the cemetery at Woodstock College.

Works

Notes

References

Citations

Sources

Further reading 
 
 

1840 births
1902 deaths
19th-century American Jesuits
20th-century American Jesuits
Clergy from New York City
Mount St. Mary's University alumni
Presidents of Boston College
Rectors of Woodstock College
Spring Hill College